The Last of Us: Season 1 (Soundtrack from the HBO Original Series) is the score album to the HBO television series The Last of Us based on the 2013 video game developed by Naughty Dog, created by Craig Mazin and Neil Druckmann. The album, released on March 6, 2023 by Milan Records, featured 66-tracks from the original score written and produced by Gustavo Santaolalla and David Fleming. Santaolalla, who composed the music for the video game had recrafted the original themes instead of creating new music, and focused elements he found interesting, while Fleming's work was inspired by real-world sounds within a decayed civilization.

Development 
On March 12, 2020, Gustavo Santaolalla was announced to score music for the series, after scoring for the video game and its sequel. He recrafted and adapted his music for the video games instead of creating new and original score, focusing on the elements he found interesting. He said Latino viewers "will recognize touches" of his music. Speaking to Liz Shannon Miller of Consequence, Santaolalla said:"The process of adapting, it was more in a way like craftwork than actually a new creation, because the themes were there, and also the sonic fabric [...] The aesthetics of those sounds. It was kind of an expansion, but trying to keep it close to the game, because that’s what’s keeping it close to the story. [Mazin and Druckmann] have said both in interviews that they feel that the music is part of the DNA of The Last of Us. It’s really a character that is totally tied to the story. Without this music, it would have been The Last of Us without Ellie or without Joel, you can’t conceive it. The music is entwined with the story."He felt that "it's very extremely rare that every cue that you present will go immediately. So if you multiply that by 185, which are the cues that are in the series, there was a lot of work. But in terms of the themes, we already had that prime matter that you need to build the thing." In few instances, Santaolalla wrote new music for the third episode, "Long, Long Time" where he had to accompany the love story that emerges between survivors Bill (Nick Offerman) and Frank (Murray Bartlett). On January 10, 2023, David Fleming was announced as the co-composer for the film's score.

Track listing

Songs used in the series

Reception 
Ernesto Valenzuela of /Film wrote "just as fans of the game can grow excited with the retelling of the game's story with additional world-building, the same can be said for Santaolalla's music. The composer's work on the series shows that creative overlap may prove essential in video game adaptations".

References 

2023 soundtrack albums
Milan Records soundtracks
Soundtrack
Television soundtracks